The Amphitheatre of Catrum Rauracense is the youngest known surviving Roman amphitheatre across the entire Roman Empire. It is located in the ancient Roman fort of Castrum Rauracense, near Kaiseraugst, Switzerland and only ruins survive today. It is the eighth Roman amphitheatre discovered in Switzerland to date.

The fort was built around 300 AD, and the amphitheatre also dates to the fourth century, shortly before the collapse of the Roman Empire and local Germanic tribes moved into the area; the amphitheatre was extant by around 337 to 341 AD based on coins found at the site. A boathouse was planned to be built on the site, and the ruins of a Roman quarry were expected to be found. Excavations by the Aargau Canton Archaeology Department, led by Jakob Baerlocher, began on the site in December 2021 and the amphitheatre was discovered instead, with parts of the gates and side entrances complete with preserved sandstone threshold and parts of the interior walls coated with plaster being uncovered. The remains of the amphitheatre will be left in situ and the boathouse will be built above the ruins, with a glass viewing platform to observe the ruins.

References 

Roman amphitheatres